Emmanuel Akwuegbu (born 20 December 1978 in Nigeria) is a Nigerian-Austrian football coach and retired footballer.

Career

Germany

Chalking up five goals as Stuttgarter Kickers got three points four times in a row leading up to December 2005, Akuwegbu contract ended with the Kickers next July, but engaged in a conflict with them, stating that his contract was still valid until 2007. However, extenuating circumstances allowed the management to officially end the contract. The Nigerian-Austrian then went on to stay with SV Sandhausen until 2008 and SV Elversberg until 2009.

India

Hitting a hat-trick on his debut as Sporting Clube de Goa put six past Malabar United at the 2010 Indian Federation Cup, the former Lens man was involved in a road accident that fall, causing him to be sidelined and eventually released.

References

External links 
 Injuries set my football career back - Akwuegbu
 at Soccerway

1978 births
Living people
Association football forwards
Expatriate footballers in Germany
SW Bregenz players
SV Elversberg players
SV Sandhausen players
Nigerian football managers
Austrian footballers
Austrian people of Nigerian descent
Expatriate footballers in India
Sporting Clube de Goa players
RC Lens players
FC Waidhofen/Ybbs players
Stuttgarter Kickers players
Austrian football managers
Expatriate footballers in Austria
Expatriate footballers in France
Regionalliga players
Austrian Football Bundesliga players
2. Liga (Austria) players